Krung Thai Bank Football Club was a Thai professional football club based in Bangkok.

History
Krung Thai Bank F.C. was a football club from central Bangkok established by Krung Thai Bank, PCL. in 1977. Krung Thai Bank officially withdrew from the Thailand football scene in January 2009 after being bought out by Bangkok Glass. Although selling out their Thailand Premier League status to BGFC Sport, Krung Thai Bank did enter the 2009 Queen's Cup as finale competition.

Stadium
Krung Thai Bank F.C. used the multi-purpose Chulalongkorn University Stadium. This holds around 20,000 spectators, but during their AFC Champions League 2008 campaign, they attracted 2,000 fans for their opening clash against Japanese opposition Kashima Antlers. But during the rest of the campaign, they only attracted over 500 fans, not enough for the AFC rule. This is one of the reasons why the AFC reduced the number of Thai entrants to the Champions League, due to poor turnout and the lack of promoting their Champions League and domestic football games.

Stadium and locations

Results

Domestic league record 1996–2008

International matches 2004–08

Honours
Domestic
Thai Premier League:
 Winner (2) 2002/03, 2003–04
Thailand Division 1 League:
 Winner (1) 1997
Khǒr Royal Cup (Tier 2): (Thai: ถ้วย ข.):
Winner (1) 1993
Thai League Cup:
Winner (1) 1992
Kor Royal Cup: (Thai: ถ้วย ก.):
 Winner (2) 1989, 1988

Coaches
Coaches by Years (2002/03 – 2008)

References

External links

 Official Website
 Interview (Thai) BGFC Part 1 By BallthaiTV.com (15 Dec 2009)
 Interview (Thai) BGFC Part 2 By BallthaiTV.com (17 Dec 2009)

 
Defunct football clubs in Thailand
Football clubs in Thailand
Association football clubs established in 1977
Association football clubs disestablished in 2009
Pathum Thani province
1977 establishments in Thailand
2009 disestablishments in Thailand
Financial services association football clubs in Thailand